The Prairieland Conference  is a high school conference in western central Illinois. The conference participates in athletics and activities in the Illinois High School Association. The conference comprises small public high schools with enrollments between 50 and 400 students in portions of Fulton, Knox, Mason, McDonough, Peoria, Schuyler, and Warren counties.

History
Formed in 1982, the Prairieland Conference had eight original members which included; Abingdon, Bushnell-Prairie City, Cuba, Elmwood, Farmington, Knoxville, Lewistown and London Mills (Spoon River Valley). Spoon River Valley would be the first school to leave the league, joining the Inter County Athletic Conference By 1990, Elmwood began a football coop with Brimfield but remained in the league. Meanwhile, Farmington and Knoxville would leave the conference and head to the Olympic Conference being replaced with schools from Havana and Astoria, who already had established a coop with Table Grove (VIT) for football. In 1995, Peoria Heights would join the conference. Coops would continue to form as Table Grove (VIT) and Astoria would join forces in 1997 and be known as South Fulton. Also in 1997, Spoon River Valley would return to the conference from the Bi-County Conference. Rounding out the 1990s, Petersburg (PORTA) would come into the league as well as a coop with Monmouth Yorkwood and Roseville in 1999. This would give the conference 10 teams for football.

Roseville and Monmouth Warren High Schools consolidated in 2004 to become Monmouth United. This would end the coop for Roseville with Yorkwood, however, Joy Westmer took the opportunity to join forces with Yorkwood and begin their coop that same year, pulling Yorkwood out of the conference into the Lincoln Trail. Yet another coop would form in 2006 as Cuba and Spoon River Valley would join forces and become known as North Fulton. Brimfield would fully join the league in 2008, leaving the Inter County Athletic. In 2009, Petersburg (PORTA) would leave the conference for the Sangamo Conference. Prior to the 2010 school year, Beardstown and Rushville-Industry would join the league and Farmington would make their return after being gone for 20 years. In 2013 Abingdon and Avon High Schools consolidated and Bushnell-Prairie City, West Prairie, North Fulton and Peoria Heights had opted to play 8-man football. Abingdon-Avon left the Prairieland and moved to the Lincoln Trail Conference in 2021. Sciota West Prairie moved to the Prairieland in 2014 from the Lincoln Trail Conference. Beardstown would leave the league in 2015 for the Western Illinois Valley. In 2018, Illini West would join the Prairieland, however, it would only stay for 3 years, returning to the West Central in 2021. In that same year, Macomb would leave the West Central and join the Prairieland. In 2022, the Cuba Spoon River Valley coop would join forces with Lewistown for football.

Current membership

Sources:IHSA Conferences, IHSA Coop Teams, and IHSA Member Schools Directory

Membership timeline

Cooperative Arrangements
Astoria+VIT=South Fulton
Cuba+Spoon River Valley=North Fulton
Havana+Illini Central for boys wrestling only
Brimfield and Elmwood do not coop for basketball
Bushnell-PC and West Prairie coop as BWP in baseball, football, softball and track.  The schools do not coop in boys basketball, girls basketball, scholastic bowl or volleyball.

Competitive Success
The Prairieland Conference has won 9 state championships in IHSA sponsored athletics and activities.

State Champions

Boys Baseball
Lewistown (1992-1993 A)
Peoria Heights (2017 1A)

Boys Basketball
Brimfield (2015 1A)

Boys Cross Country
Elmwood (1977-1978 A)
Elmwood (1983-1984 A)
Elmwood (1984-1985 A)
Elmwood (1985-1986 A)
Elmwood (2006-2007 A)
Elmwood (2008-2009 1A)
Elmwood (2013-2014 1A)
Elmwood (2016-2017 1A)
Elmwood (2017-2018 1A)

Boys Golf
 Havana (1998-1999 A)

Girls Basketball
Brimfield (2022 1A)

Girls Volleyball
West Prairie (2016 1A)

References

External links
 Prairieland Football Conference, Black Division Prairieland Black Conference schedules and standings
 Prairieland Football Conference, Blue Division Prairieland Blue Conference schedules and standings
 Abingdon High School
 Astoria High School
 Avon High School
 Brimfield High School
 Bushnell-Prairie City High School
 Cuba High School
 Elmwood High School
 Havana High School
 Knoxville High School
 Knoxville High School Football
 Lewistown High School
 Peoria Heights High School
 Spoon River Valley High School
 VIT High School
 West Prairie High School

High school sports conferences and leagues in the United States
Illinois high school sports conferences
High school sports in Illinois